Kainuu Orienteering Week (KOW) is an annual Finnish, international, orienteering event. Kainuu Orienteering Week is organized by Kainuun Rastiviikko Association. Measured by the number of participants, Kainuu Orienteering Week is one of the top-15 sports events in Finland and it is also one of the main events of The Finnish Orienteering Federation.

Kainuu Orienteering Week is the second oldest orienteering week in the world and the first event was arranged in 1966. Since then the event has been held every year, except 1974. The event attracted 315 orienteers in the first year and the participant record is from 2007 when there were 4,884 orienteers in Kainuu Orinteering Week. In 2011 the first city orienteering sprint, organised through the KOW, was run.

Statistics

See also
Jukola relay

External links
 Kainuu Orienteering Week website

Notes

Orienteering competitions
Orienteering in Finland
Recurring sporting events established in 1966